In Tamil Nadu, there is a separate Highways Department (HD) was established in April 1946 and the same has been renamed as Highways & Minor Ports Department (HMPD) on 30 October 2008. HMPD of Tamil Nadu is primarily responsible for construction and maintenance of roads including National Highways, State Highways and Major District Roads in Tamil Nadu.

Roads with traffic density less than 10,000 PCUs but more than 5,000 PCUs are designated as major district roads (MDR). MDR's provide linkage between production and marketing centres within a district. It also provides connections between district and taluk headquarters with the state highways and national highways. Construction and maintenance is carryout by the Highways Department fort MDR along with State Highways & ODR. These roads have a minimum width of 15 meters.

Lane wise distribution 

Details of Lane wise distribution of MDR roads in Tamilnadu as of March 2013.

List of MDRs 
List of Major district roads in Tamil Nadu (as of March 2019).

MDR 1 to MDR 100

MDR 101 to MDR 200

MDR 201 to MDR 300

MDR 301 to MDR 400

MDR 401 to MDR 500

MDR 501 to MDR 600

MDR 601 to MDR 700

MDR 701 to MDR 800

MDR 801 to MDR 900

MDR 901 to MDR 1000

MDR 1001 to MDR 1100

MDR 1101 to MDR 1200

See also 
 Highways of Tamil Nadu 
 Road Network in Tamil Nadu
 National Highways
 List of National Highways in India
 List of National Highways in India (by Highway Number)
 National Highways Authority of India
 List of other district roads in Tamil Nadu

References 

Roads in Tamil Nadu
Tamil Nadu highways
Tamil Nadu-related lists